Chengjiangocaris is an extinct genus of fuxianhuiid arthropod known from the Cambrian of South China. It contains two species, C. longiformis which was described in 1991. C. kunmingensis was described in 2013 by Javier Ortega-Hernández and colleagues. One specimen of C. kunmingensis shows detailed evidence of a nervous system.
The nervous system of the chengjiangocaris is and has always been very complex to understand but a recent discovery of the ladder like ventral nerval cords and segmental ganglia of the related chengjiangocaris together with the brain provide the most comprehensive reconstruction of any lower Cambrian arthropod.

Anatomy 

C. kunmingensis has 20 anterior trunk tergites and up to 16 narrow anterior tergites.

Phylogeny 
After

References

Further reading
Jie Yang et al., Fuxianhuiid ventral nerve cord and early nervous system evolution in Panarthropoda - abstract, Proceedings of the National Academy of Sciences, subscription required for full article
Javier Ortega-Hernández, Opinion: Our 500 million-year-old nervous system fossil shines a light on animal evolution, CC-BY 4.0
Paleontologists Find 520 Million-Year-Old Fossilized Central Nervous System, Sci-News.com
Chengjiang Maotianshan Shales Fossils, FossilMuseum.net

External links
Photos at Nature.com

Cambrian arthropods
Cambrian animals of Asia
Fossils of China
Maotianshan shales fossils
Cambrian genus extinctions